California Academy for Liberal Studies Early College High (CALS) is an alternative charter high school of the Los Angeles Unified School District located in Downtown Los Angeles.

External links

California School Directory entry for CALS
School Demographics

Alternative schools in California
Charter high schools in California
Downtown Los Angeles
High schools in Los Angeles
Los Angeles Unified School District
Los Angeles Unified School District schools